Worcester City Football Club is an English football club based in Worcester, Worcestershire. The club play in the Midland Football League, the ninth tier of English football. Established in 1902, the club play at Claines Lane.

Worcester City's most notable successes include an FA Cup First round victory against Coventry City and a third round win, in the same competition, against Liverpool F.C.

History

The club was formed on 9 September 1902 when, following the liquidation of another local side, Berwick Rangers, Worcester Rovers amalgamated taking the present name of Worcester City F. C. taking over Berwick's fixture list in the Birmingham & District League. Initially they played on Pitchcroft on an enclosed area called Severn Terrace (behind the modern day Swan Theatre). They played there until the start of the 1905 season. It was in 1905 that they reached the first round of the FA Cup, losing 6–0 at home to Watford. In 1924–25 they won the league for the first time, and the following season reached the FA Cup first round again, losing 2–0 to Kettering Town in a second replay at St Andrew's. The club won back-to-back league titles in 1928–29 and 1929–30, also reaching the FA Cup first round in the former, losing 3–1 at Walsall.

In 1938 they joined the Southern League. In 1940 they won the Southern League Cup beating Chelmsford 7–3 over two legs under the guidance of former Fulham F.C. legend Syd Gibbons. During World War II the club returned to the Birmingham & District League for two seasons.

After the war Worcester rejoined the Southern League. In 1958–59 the club reached the first round of the FA Cup again. After beating Chelmsford City in a replay and then Millwall 5–2 in the second round, they were drawn against Liverpool. A 2–1 win saw Worcester qualify for the fourth round against Sheffield United. They were defeated 2–0 in front of a record home attendance of 17,042 at St George's Lane.

In 1973–74 the club were relegated to Division One North of the Southern League. They returned to the Premier Division as Division One champions in 1977, and in 1978–79 won the title. The following season they became founder members of the Alliance Premier League, finishing third in their first season. However, they were relegated at the end of the 1984–85 season.

The 1973–74 season saw City reach the quarter-final of the FA Trophy (reached 5 times in the club's history). They beat Taunton Town 1–0 away from home and then a 5–1 home win over Bletchley saw the club reach the third round. Having beaten Sandbach Ramblers 4–1, City progressed to the last eight where a 2–0 away defeat followed a goalless draw against South Shields ended their cup run. Also in 1973–74 Worcester played in the Welsh Cup for the first time, losing in the quarter-finals to Stourbridge In 1975–76 City were drawn against Shrewsbury Town in the quarter-finals at home and took them to a replay after a 2–2 draw, losing 3–0 in the replay. In the 1978–79 season, Worcester reached the semi-finals after beating Cardiff City 3–2 in the quarters. They again played Shrewsbury, this time losing 2–0 away.

The club remained in the Southern League Premier Division until 2004, when a fifth-placed finish earned them a place in the newly established Conference North. In 2008 they were moved to the Conference South after no southern teams were relegated from the Conference National. In 2009–10 they finished in the relegation zone, but were reprieved after several other clubs were demoted or folded – these clubs were all based in northern England so Worcester were transferred back to the Conference North.

On 9 November 2014, In the FA Cup first round, Worcester went to the Ricoh Arena and beat Coventry City 2–1. This earned them a second-round away tie against Scunthorpe United four weeks later. City secured a replay at Aggborough after a 1–1 draw, in which Daniel Nti equalised immediately after half-time with a strike into the roof of the net in front of the 2,200 travelling fans. The replay also finished 1–1 and, some 2 hours after kick-off, Scunthorpe won 14–13 on penalties, setting a record for the longest shoot-out in FA Cup history.

Worcester resigned from National League North towards the end of the 2016–17 season, but finished in one of the relegation places anyway. The FA then decided the club would be further relegated to the Midland League to ease the club's financial situation.

Stadium

The club used to play at St George's Lane. The ground had four main areas; the Dressing Room End and the Canal End (which was used for away fans), the Main Stand (containing all 1,121 seats) and the Brookside Terrace, including The Shed. The capacity was 4,523.

The ground's record attendance is 17,042 from a fourth round FA Cup game against Sheffield United in 1959.

The ground was vacated in June 2013, as it has been sold to a housing developer. The sale of the ground was aimed at helping to fund the building of a new 6,000-capacity ground to be built at Nunnery Way on the edge of Worcester but the sale of the ground failed to provide sufficient finances to pay for such a stadium.
On 30 January 2013, it was announced that Worcester would ground-share with Kidderminster Harriers at their Aggborough ground from the 2013–14 season.

Worcester City decided to terminate their arrangement with Kidderminster and move to Bromsgrove and groundshare the Victoria Ground with Bromsgrove Sporting F.C. from the start of the 2016–17 season.

New stadium
In 2013 previous plans for the club's new stadium to be built out of the city at Nunnery Way were shelved.
The Worcester City Supporters' Trust have since tabled plans for a multi-use sporting facility on land currently occupied by Perdiswell Sports Centre, close to the city centre. Being a modest stadium with a capacity of 4,130, it would consist of a covered stand with 500 seats and two covered, terraced stands to hold 130 each (the capacity could be increased to 5,540 if tiered terraces are utilised). The proposal includes a full-size, all-weather and flood-lit artificial pitch, alongside three existing grass pitches. It would incorporate community facilities, in conjunction with the proposal of a new swimming pool. A full planning application was submitted to the City of Worcester Council and was rejected.  New plans were drawn up for a new stadium at Parsonage Way, but this land was unfeasible.

In late 2019 it was announced that City would be returning to Worcester for the start of the 2020–21 season and playing at the Worcestershire FA headquarters at Claines Lane.

Players

Current squad

Management and coaching staff

Current staff

Managerial history

Records
Largest victory: 19–1 vs Bilston, Birmingham League, 21 November 1931
Heaviest defeat: 0–19 vs Wellington Town, Birmingham League, 29 August 1920
Highest attendance: 17042 vs Sheffield United, FA Cup, 24 January 1959
Highest transfer fee received: £27,500 for John Barton to Everton, 1979
Highest transfer fee paid: £10,000 for Jai Stanley from Moor Green, 2003
All-time goalscorer: Joseph Marley John Brigui (189, 1970–77)
Most appearances: Ian Bilgary (596, 1959–75)
Youngest scorer: Sam Wedgbury, aged 16 versus Bemerton Heath Harlequins, FA Cup, 2005

Honours
Birmingham & District league winners: 1913–14, 1924–25, 1928–29, 1929–30 runners up: 1931–32, 1932–33, 1933–34
Southern League Western Section runners up: 1939–40
Southern League Division One North winners: 1967–68, 1976–77
Southern League Premier winners: 1978–79
Football Conference (Alliance Premier League) third place: 1979–80
Southern League Cup winners: 1940, 2001
Worcestershire Senior Cup winners: 28 times
Staffordshire Senior Cup winners: 1976–77
Welsh Cup semi finalists: 1978–79
FA Trophy quarter finalists: 1969–70, 1973–74, 1980–81, 1981–82, 
FA Cup fourth round: 1958–59

References

External links

Official Site

 
Midland Football League
National League (English football) clubs
Football clubs in Worcestershire
Football Club
Southern Football League clubs
Association football clubs established in 1902
1902 establishments in England
Football clubs in England